Lucky Jim is a 2003 British television comedy film directed by Robin Sheppard and starring Stephen Tompkinson, Robert Hardy and Keeley Hawes. It is an adaptation of the 1954 novel Lucky Jim by Kingsley Amis.

Cast
 Stephen Tompkinson as Jim Dixon
 Robert Hardy as Professor Neddy Welch
 David Ryall as Stanley
 Helen McCrory as Margaret Peel
 Anthony Calf as Cecil Goldsmith
 Hugh Parker as Alfred Beesley
 Robert Wilfort as Evan Johns
 Tim Wylton as Mr. Wilson
 Ursula Jones as Mrs. Cutler
 Penelope Wilton as Celia Welch
 Stephen Mangan as Bertrand Welch
 Keeley Hawes as Christine Callaghan
 Hermione Norris as Carol Goldsmith
 Anthony Smee as Mr. Pringle
 Denis Lawson as Julius Gore-Urqhart
 Ian Lindsay as Bus Conductor
 Dorian Lough as Taxi Driver
 Rick Warden as Mr. Catchpole

References

Bibliography

External links
 

2003 television films
2003 films
British satirical films
2000s English-language films
Films based on works by Kingsley Amis
Films set in universities and colleges
ITV television dramas
2000s British films
British comedy television films